Gaultheria procumbens, also called the eastern teaberry, the checkerberry, the boxberry, or the American wintergreen, is a species of Gaultheria native to northeastern North America from Newfoundland west to southeastern Manitoba, and south to Alabama. It is a member of the Ericaceae (heath family).

Growth and habitat 

They are borne in leaf axils, usually one to three per stem. The anthers are forked somewhat like a snake's tongue, with two awns at the tip.

It is an epigynous berry, with the majority of the flesh of the fruit being composed of the fleshy calyx.

The plant is a calcifuge, favoring acidic soil, in pine or hardwood forests, although it generally produces fruit only in sunnier areas. It often grows as part of the heath complex in an oak–heath forest.

G. procumbens spreads by means of long rhizomes, which are within the top  of soil. Because of the shallow nature of the rhizomes, it does not survive most forest fires, but a brief or mild fire may leave rhizomes intact, from which the plant can regrow even if the above-ground shrub was consumed.

This plant has gained the Royal Horticultural Society's Award of Garden Merit.

Edibility
The fruits of G. procumbens, considered its actual "teaberries", are edible, with a taste of mildly sweet wintergreen similar to the flavors of the Mentha varieties M. piperita (peppermint) and M. spicata (spearmint) even though G. procumbens is not a true mint. The leaves and branches make a fine herbal tea, through normal drying and infusion process. For the leaves to yield significant amounts of their essential oil, they need to be fermented for at least three days. The berries and leaves contain methyl salicylate, a compound that is closely related to aspirin.

Teaberry extract can be used to flavor tea, candy, medicine and chewing gum. Teaberry is also a flavor of ice cream in regions where the plant grows. It likewise inspired the name of Clark's Teaberry chewing gum.

Wildlife value 
Wintergreen is not taken in large quantities by any species of wildlife, but the regularity of its use enhances its importance. Its fruit persist through the winter, and it is one of the few sources of green leaves in winter. White-tailed deer browse wintergreen throughout its range, and in some localities it is an important winter food. Other animals that eat wintergreen are wild turkey, sharp-tailed grouse, northern bobwhite, ring-necked pheasant, black bear, white-footed mouse, and red fox.  Wintergreen is a favorite food of the eastern chipmunk, and the leaves are a minor winter food of the gray squirrel in Virginia.

Common names 
Other common names for G. procumbens include American mountain tea, boxberry, Canada tea, canterberry, checkerberry, chickenberry, creeping wintergreen, deerberry, drunkards, gingerberry, greenberry, ground berry, ground tea, grouseberry, hillberry, mountain tea, one-berry, procalm, red pollom, spice berry, squaw vine, star berry, spiceberry, spicy wintergreen, spring wintergreen, teaberry, wax cluster, and youngsters.

While this plant is sometimes mistakenly known as partridge berry, that name more often refers to the ground cover Mitchella repens.

Traditional use
The plant has been used by various tribes of Native Americans for medicinal purposes.

See also
 Clark's Teaberry
 Wintergreens
 Gaultheria humifusa - alpine wintergreen
 Gaultheria ovatifolia - western teaberry or Oregon spicy wintergreen

Gallery

References

External links

 
 

procumbens
Flora of the Eastern United States
Flora of Canada
Plants used in traditional Native American medicine
Spices
Hardwood forest plants
Plants described in 1753
Taxa named by Carl Linnaeus